Christopher Todd Donahue (born August 13, 1969) is a United States Army lieutenant general who has served as the commanding general of XVIII Airborne Corps since March 11, 2022. He most recently served as commanding general of the 82nd Airborne Division at Fort Bragg, North Carolina. Throughout his career, Donahue served in staff and command positions for both United States Army and Special Operations units.

In August 2021, Donahue gained fame as the last international military personnel to leave Afghanistan during America's military withdrawal from the country.

Military career

Donahue is a graduate of the United States Military Academy at West Point, New York, and was commissioned as a second lieutenant into the Infantry Branch of the United States Army in 1992. His first assignment was rifle platoon leader with 2nd Infantry Division, Eighth Army in South Korea, followed by service at Fort Polk, Louisiana, and 3rd Ranger Battalion, 75th Ranger Regiment as company executive officer. Donahue then received assignment as rifle company commander in the 5th Battalion, 87th Infantry Regiment in Camp Kobbe, Panama. In 1998 Donahue transferred to 2nd Battalion, 75th Ranger Regiment as assistant operations officer, rifle company commander, and headquarters company commander. He was then assigned to Washington D.C as Special Assistant to the Chairman of the Joint Chiefs of Staff. In 2002 Donahue volunteered for and completed a specialized selection and operator training course for assignment to the army's 1st Special Forces Operational Detachment – Delta, publicly known as Delta Force, at Fort Bragg. He would serve numerous leadership positions as assistant operations officer, squadron operations officer, squadron executive officer, troop commander, selection and training detachment commander, operations officer, squadron commander, deputy commander and unit commander.

Donahue earned a master's degree from the Naval Command and Staff College, Naval War College and completed an Army War College Fellowship at Harvard University in 2013.

Donahue's deployments include Operation Enduring Freedom, Operation Iraqi Freedom, Operation New Dawn, Operation Freedom Sentinel and Operation Inherent Resolve. He planned, rehearsed and operated during classified operations in Eastern Europe, Middle East, Southwest Asia, and Africa.

Donahue's most recent assignments include: Director of Operations, Joint Special Operations Command; the Commandant, United States Army Infantry School at Fort Benning; Deputy commanding General (maneuver) of the 4th Infantry Division at Fort Carson; Deputy Director for Special Operations and Counterterrorism, J-37 Joint Staff; Commanding General, NATO Special Operations Component Command/Special Operations Joint Task Force-Afghanistan, Resolute Support Mission, 2019–2020; and the Commanding General, 82nd Airborne Division from 2020 to 2021. On August 30, 2021, he was the last American soldier to leave Afghanistan, closing at the same time Operation Allies Refuge, the 2021 evacuation from Afghanistan and the withdrawal of United States troops from Afghanistan.

In February 2022, he was nominated for promotion to lieutenant general and assignment as commanding general of the XVIII Airborne Corps, succeeding Michael Kurilla.

September 11 attacks
On the morning of September 11, 2001, Donahue, who was a captain at that time, was on Capitol Hill accompanying Vice Chairman of the Joint Chiefs of Staff General Richard Myers, to whom he was an aide. Myers was scheduled to meet Georgia Senator Max Cleland for a courtesy call before his Senate confirmation hearing to be the next Chairman of the Joint Chiefs of Staff. Later-on, Donahue received first-hand intelligence report that a hijacked plane had hit the south tower of the World Trade Center and informed Myers of the hijacking and the current situation. At one point Donahue also lent his cell phone to Myers who used it to call General Ralph Eberhart, the Commander-in-Chief of the North American Aerospace Defense Command, to get further information regarding the situation. Immediately, Donahue and Myers proceeded to The Pentagon. When Myers' Lincoln Town Car had almost arrived at The Pentagon, Donahue informed Myers that he saw smoke arise from The Pentagon and at that point they learned that The Pentagon had also been hit by one of the Commercial Aircraft that was hijacked that day, later identified to be American Airlines Flight 77. They arrived at The Pentagon a few moments after the plane had hit, and immediately rendezvoused with Secretary of Defense Donald Rumsfeld and Deputy Secretary of Defense Paul Wolfowitz. Myers was designated as Acting-Chairman of the Joint Chiefs of Staff at that time of the attack, due to the incumbent Chairman General Hugh Shelton was en-route to Europe for incoming NATO summit, and Donahue remained with him throughout the day.

Awards and decorations

See also
 Boris Gromov, the last Russian soldier to leave Afghanistan

References

1969 births
Living people
United States Military Academy alumni
United States Army Rangers
College of Naval Command and Staff alumni
United States Army personnel of the Iraq War
United States Army personnel of the War in Afghanistan (2001–2021)
United States Army generals
Recipients of the Legion of Merit
Recipients of the Defense Superior Service Medal